The 1993 NHL Entry Draft was the 31st NHL Entry Draft. It took place on June 26, 1993, at the Colisée de Québec in Quebec City, Quebec.

First overall pick Alexandre Daigle is widely regarded today as one of the all-time greatest draft busts in NHL history. Regarding his draft position, Daigle uttered the now infamous comment, "I'm glad I got drafted first, because no one remembers number two". Chris Pronger, selected after Daigle with pick two by the Hartford Whalers, was elected to the Hockey Hall of Fame in 2015.

The last active player in the NHL from the 1993 NHL entry draft was Kimmo Timonen, who retired after the 2014–15 season right after winning the Stanley Cup with the Chicago Blackhawks.

Selections by round

Round one

Notes
 The San Jose Sharks' first-round pick went to the Hartford Whalers as the result of a trade on June 26, 1993 that sent Sergei Makarov, first and third-round pick both in 1993 (6th and 58th overall) and Toronto's second-round pick (45th overall) in 1993 to San Jose in exchange for this pick.
 The Hartford Whalers' first-round pick went to the San Jose Sharks as the result of a trade on June 26, 1993 that sent the second overall pick in 1993 to Hartford in exchange for Sergei Makarov, Toronto's second-round pick (45th overall) and a third-round pick (58th overall) both in 1993 and this pick.
 The Philadelphia Flyers' first-round pick went to the Quebec Nordiques as the result of a trade on June 30, 1992 that sent the Eric Lindros to Philadelphia in exchange for Ron Hextall, Peter Forsberg, Steve Duchesne, Kerry Huffman, Mike Ricci, future considerations (Chris Simon and a first-round pick in 1994 on July 21, 1992), $15 million in cash and this pick.
 The St. Louis Blues' first-round pick went to the Washington Capitals as compensation for not matching an offer sheet from St. Louis to restricted free agent Scott Stevens on July 16, 1990.
 The Buffalo Sabres' first-round pick went to the Toronto Maple Leafs as the result of a trade on February 2, 1993 that sent Grant Fuhr and a fifth-round pick in 1995 to Buffalo in exchange for Dave Andreychuk, Darren Puppa and this pick.
 The New York Islanders' first-round pick went to the Quebec Nordiques as the result of a trade on June 20, 1993 that sent Ron Hextall and a first-round pick in 1993 (23rd overall) to New York in exchange for Mark Fitzpatrick and this pick.
 The Los Angeles Kings' first-round pick went to the Edmonton Oilers as the result of a trade on August 9, 1988 that sent Wayne Gretzky, Mike Krushelnyski and Marty McSorley to Los Angeles in exchange for Jimmy Carson, Martin Gelinas, $15 million in cash and first-round picks in 1989, 1991 and this pick.
 The Quebec Nordiques' first-round pick went to the New York Islanders as the result of a trade on June 20, 1993 that sent Mark Fitzpatrick and a first-round pick in 1993 (14th overall) to Quebec in exchange for Ron Hextall and this pick.

Round two

Notes
 The Florida Panthers' second-round pick went to the Winnipeg Jets as the result of a trade on June 26, 1993 that sent a second and third-round pick both in 1993 (41st and 67th overall) to Florida in exchange for this pick.
 The Hartford Whalers' second-round pick went to the New Jersey Devils as the result of a trade on August 28, 1992 that sent Sean Burke and Eric Weinrich to Hartford in exchange for Bobby Holik, a conditional pick in 1994 and this pick.
 The Winnipeg Jets' second-round pick went to the Florida Panthers as the result of a trade on June 26, 1993 that sent a second-round pick in 1993 (31st overall) to Winnipeg in exchange for a third-round pick in 1993 (67th overall) and this pick.
 The Washington Capitals' second-round pick went to the Winnipeg Jets as the result of a trade on March 22, 1993 that sent Rick Tabaracci to Washington in exchange for Jim Hrivnak and this pick.
 The Toronto Maple Leafs' second-round pick went to the San Jose Sharks as the result of a trade on June 26, 1993 that sent the second overall pick in 1993 to Hartford in exchange for Sergei Makarov, a first and third-round pick both in 1993 (6th and 58th overall) and this pick.
Hartford previously acquired this pick as the result of a trade on November 24, 1992 that sent John Cullen to Toronto in exchange for this pick.

Round three

Notes
 The San Jose Sharks' third-round pick went to the Chicago Blackhawks as the result of a trade on September 20, 1991 that sent Wayne Presley to San Jose in exchange for this pick.
 The Tampa Bay Lightning's third-round pick was re-acquired as the result of a trade on June 25, 1993 that sent Glenn Healy to New York in exchange for this pick.
The New York Rangers previously acquired this pick as compensation for not matching an offer sheet from Tampa Bay to restricted free agent Rob Zamuner on July 13, 1992.
 The Hartford Whalers' third-round pick went to the San Jose Sharks as the result of a trade on June 26, 1993 that sent the second overall pick in 1993 to Hartford in exchange for Sergei Makarov, a first-round pick and Toronto's second-round pick both in 1993 (6th and 45th overall) and this pick.
 The New York Rangers' third-round pick went to the Edmonton Oilers as the result of a trade on December 11, 1992 that sent Kevin Lowe to New York in exchange for Roman Oksiuta and this pick.
 The Dallas Stars' third-round pick went to the New York Rangers as the result of a trade on March 10, 1992 that sent Mark Janssens to Minnesota in exchange for Mario Thyer and this pick.
 The Philadelphia Flyers' third-round pick went to the Pittsburgh Penguins as the result of a trade on February 19, 1992 that sent Mark Recchi, Brian Benning and a first-round pick in 1992 to Philadelphia in exchange for Kjell Samuelsson, Rick Tocchet, Ken Wregget and this pick.
 The Winnipeg Jets' third-round pick went to the Florida Panthers as the result of a trade on June 26, 1993 that sent a second-round pick in 1993 (31st overall) to Winnipeg in exchange for a second-round pick in 1993 (41st overall) and this pick.
 The Toronto Maple Leafs' third-round pick went to the Philadelphia Flyers as the result of a trade on June 29, 1991 that sent the rights to Mike Bullard to Toronto in exchange for this pick.
 The Vancouver Canucks' third-round pick went to the Hartford Whalers as the result of a trade on March 22, 1993 that sent Murray Craven, and a fifth-round pick in 1993 (124th overall) to Vancouver in exchange for Robert Kron, future considerations (Jim Sandlak on May 17, 1993) and this pick.
 The Boston Bruins' third-round pick went to the Philadelphia Flyers was re-acquired as the result of a trade on June 11, 1993 that sent Stephane Beauregard back to Winnipeg in exchange for Philadelphia's fifth-round pick in 1994 and this pick.
Winnipeg previously acquired this pick as the result of a trade on October 1, 1992 that sent Stephane Beauregard to Philadelphia in exchange for a fifth-round pick in 1994 and this pick.
Philadelphia previously acquired this pick as the result of a trade on January 2, 1992 that sent Gord Murphy, Brian Dobbin, a third-round pick in 1992 and a fourth-round pick in 1993 (88th overall) to Boston in exchange for Garry Galley, Wes Walz and this pick.
 The Pittsburgh Penguins' third-round pick went to the Florida Panthers as the result of a trade on June 26, 1993, that ensured that Florida selected Darren Puppa in the 1993 NHL Expansion Draft from Toronto to Tampa Bay in exchange for this pick.
Tampa Bay previously acquired this pick as the result of a trade on March 22, 1993 that sent Peter Taglianetti to Pittsburgh in exchange for this pick.

Round four

Notes
 The Ottawa Senators' fourth-round pick went to the Winnipeg Jets as the result of a trade on March 4, 1993 that sent the rights to Dmitri Filimonov to Ottawa in exchange for this pick.
 The Edmonton Oilers' fourth-round pick went to the Montreal Canadiens as the result of a trade on August 27, 1992 that sent Shayne Corson, Brent Gilchrist and Vladimir Vujtek to Edmonton in exchange for Vincent Damphousse and this pick.
 The Philadelphia Flyers' fourth-round pick went to the Boston Bruins as the result of a trade on January 2, 1992 that sent Garry Galley, Wes Walz and a third-round pick in 1993 (77th overall) to Philadelphia in exchange for Gord Murphy, Brian Dobbin, a third-round pick in 1992 and this pick.
 The Buffalo Sabres' fourth-round pick went to the Chicago Blackhawks as the result of a trade on August 7, 1992 that sent Dominik Hasek to Buffalo in exchange for Stephane Beauregard and this pick.
 The New Jersey Devils' fourth-round pick went to the Ottawa Senators as the result of a trade on June 20, 1993 that sent Peter Sidorkiewicz, future considerations (Mike Peluso on June 26, 1993) and a fifth-round pick in 1994 to New Jersey in exchange for Craig Billington, Troy Mallette and this pick.
 The Washington Capitals' fourth-round pick went to the Calgary Flames as the result of a trade on June 20, 1993 that sent Sergei Makarov to Hartford in exchange for future considerations (this pick).
Hartford previously acquired this pick as the result of a trade on October 3, 1991 that sent Todd Krygier to Washington in exchange for this pick.
 The Toronto Maple Leafs' fourth-round pick went to the Detroit Red Wings as the result of a trade on June 11, 1993 that sent Paul Ysebaert and future considerations (Alan Kerr on June 18, 1993) to Winnipeg in exchange for Aaron Ward and this pick.
Winnipeg previously acquired this pick as the result of a trade on October 1, 1992 that sent Pat Elynuik to Washington in exchange for John Druce and this pick.
Washington previously acquired this pick as the result of a trade on June 20, 1992 that sent a first and fourth-round pick both in 1992 to Toronto in exchange for New York Islanders' second-round pick and a third-round pick both in 1992 and this pick.

Round five

Notes
 The Ottawa Senators' fifth-round pick went to the Los Angeles Kings as the result of a trade on March 22, 1993 that sent John McIntyre to New York in exchange for this pick.
The New York Rangers previously acquired this pick as the result of a trade on November 5, 1992 that sent Dave Archibald to Ottawa in exchange for this pick.
 The Hartford Whalers' fifth-round pick went to the New Jersey Devils as the result of a trade on October 3, 1991 that sent Lee Norwood to Hartford in exchange for this pick.
 The Dallas Stars' fifth-round pick went to the Montreal Canadiens as the result of a trade on August 17, 1992 that sent Mike McPhee to Minnesota in exchange for this pick.
 The St. Louis Blues' fifth-round pick went to the Hartford Whalers as the result of a trade on November 13, 1991 that sent Lee Norwood to St. Louis in exchange for this pick.
 The New Jersey Devils' fifth-round pick went to the Los Angeles Kings as the result of a trade on June 26, 1993 that sent Corey Millen to New Jersey in exchange for this pick.
 The Washington Capitals' fifth-round pick went to the Calgary Flames as the result of a trade on June 26, 1993 that sent Craig Berube to Washington in exchange for this pick.
 The Vancouver Canucks' fifth-round pick was re-acquired as the result of a trade on March 22, 1993 that sent that sent Robert Kron, future considerations (Jim Sandlak on May 17, 1993) and a third-round pick in 1993 (72nd overall) to Hartford in exchange for Murray Craven, and this pick.
Hartford previously acquired this pick as the result of a trade on October 1, 1992 that sent Kay Whitmore to Vancouver in exchange for Corrie D'Alessio and this pick (being conditional at the time of the trade).

Round six

Notes
 The San Jose Sharks' sixth-round pick was re-acquired as the result of a trade on June 26, 1993 that sent Dean Evason to Dallas for this pick.
Dallas previously acquired this pick as the result of a trade on June 20, 1993 that sent Gaetan Duchesne to San Jose in exchange for this pick.
 The Hartford Whalers' sixth-round pick went to the Dallas Stars as the result of a trade on June 15, 1992 that sent Allen Pedersen to Hartford in exchange for this pick (being conditional at the time of the trade).
 The Edmonton Oilers' sixth-round pick went to the Quebec Nordiques as the result of a trade on June 20, 1993 that sent Scott Pearson to Edmonton in exchange for this pick.
 The Detroit Red Wings' sixth-round pick was re-acquired as the result of a trade on June 1, 1993 that sent Brad McCrimmon to Hartford for this pick.
Hartford previously acquired this pick as the result of a trade on March 22, 1993 that sent Steve Konroyd to Detroit in exchange for this pick.
 The Chicago Blackhawks' sixth-round pick went to the San Jose Sharks as the result of a trade on February 7, 1992 that sent Tony Hrkac to Chicago in exchange for this pick (being conditional at the time of the trade).

Round seven

Notes
 The Hartford Whalers' seventh-round pick went to the New York Rangers as the result of a trade on July 8, 1992 that sent Tim Kerr to Hartford in exchange for this pick.
 The Calgary Flames' seventh-round pick went to the Washington Capitals as the result of a trade on June 26, 1993 that sent Brad Schlegel to Calgary in exchange for this pick.

Round eight

Round nine

Notes
 The Dallas Stars' ninth-round pick went to the Winnipeg Jets as the result of a trade on March 20, 1993 that sent Mark Osiecki and a tenth-round pick in 1993 (249th overall) to Minnesota in exchange for this pick.
 The Calgary Flames' ninth-round pick went to the Philadelphia Flyers as the result of a trade on March 18, 1993 that sent Greg Paslawski to Calgary in exchange for this pick.
 The Toronto Maple Leafs' ninth-round pick went to the Ottawa Senators as the result of a trade on February 25, 1993 that sent Brad Miller to Toronto in exchange for this pick.
 The Vancouver Canucks' ninth-round pick went to the Winnipeg Jets as the result of a trade on March 22, 1993 that sent Dan Ratushny to Vancouver in exchange for this pick.

Round ten

Notes
 The Winnipeg Jets' tenth-round pick went to the Dallas Stars as the result of a trade on March 20, 1993 that sent  a ninth-round pick in 1993 (217th overall) to Winnipeg in exchange for Mark Osiecki and this pick.

Round eleven

Notes
 The Ottawa Senators' eleventh-round pick went to the New York Rangers as the result of a trade on June 20, 1992 that sent an eleventh-round pick in  1992 to Ottawa in exchange for future considerations (this pick on May 7, 1993).
 The Winnipeg Jets' eleventh-round pick went to the St. Louis Blues as the result of a trade on June 20, 1992 that sent an eleventh-round pick in 1992 to Winnipeg in exchange for this pick.
 The Boston Bruins' eleventh-round pick went to the Winnipeg Jets as the result of a trade on February 21, 1993 that sent Troy Murray to Chicago in exchange for Steve Bancroft and this pick.
Chicago previously acquired this pick as the result of a trade on January 8, 1992 that sent an eleventh-round pick in 1992 to Boston in exchange for Steve Bancroft and this pick.

Draftees based on nationality

See also
 1993 NHL Expansion Draft
 1993 NHL Supplemental Draft
 1993–94 NHL season
 List of NHL players

References

External links
1993 NHL Entry Draft player stats at The Internet Hockey Database

DRAF
National Hockey League Entry Draft